The Friis Hills are a cluster of ice-free hills,  in extent and rising to , on the north side of the bend in Taylor Glacier in Victoria Land, Antarctica. They were named after geographer and archivist Herman Ralph Friis (1906–89), Director of the Center for Polar Archives in the National Archives, a U.S. exchange scientist at the Japanese station East Ongul Island, 1969–70, and a member of the Advisory Committee on Antarctic Names, 1957–73.

Although currently "dead and dry, nothing but gravel and sand and boulders" the Friis Hills contain important geological records of the times when Antarctica was much greener.

References

Hills of Victoria Land
McMurdo Dry Valleys